Kiss Me First is a British cyber-thriller drama series created by Bryan Elsley for Channel 4 and Netflix. It began airing on 2 April 2018 on Channel 4 and was made available on Netflix worldwide on 29 June 2018.

Premise
Leila is a lonely 17-year-old girl addicted to a fictional massively multiplayer online role-playing game called Azana. While playing it, Leila meets Tess, a cool and confident party girl who harbours a dark secret. In the real world, the two girls become friends, but after Tess disappears Leila is quickly drawn into unravelling the mystery behind her disappearance.

Cast

Main
Tallulah Haddon as Leila Evans / Shadowfax
Simona Brown as Tess / Mania
Matthew Beard as Adrian Palmer
Matthew Aubrey as Jonty

Recurring
George Jovanovic as Cyril Niemec / Calumny 
Freddie Stewart as Kyle / Force 
Misha Butler as Jack Innes / Jocasta
Haruka Abe as Tomiko Teshima / Tippi
Samuel Bottomley as Ben / Denier
Philip Arditti as Azul
Geraldine Somerville as Ruth Palmer

Production
In January 2016, it was reported that Netflix and E4 would co-produce a series based on the Lottie Moggach novel of the same title, consisting of six hour-long episodes, with Netflix holding the international broadcast rights and E4 the ones for the United Kingdom. The series is a mix of live-action performances and computer-generated scenes. Principal photography started in December 2016 in London locations including Hanwell and West Ealing and Croatia and was expected to end in the middle of 2017. In February 2018, it was announced it would now air on Channel 4 and the first image was released.

Krka National Park in Croatia is the location of the scenic green pools and cascading waterfalls filmed in real life scenes for last two episodes, and the basis of virtual world scenes in earlier episodes. The Shellness Road Car Park was used in a sequence in which one character uses an improvised explosive device to blow up his abusive carer. A further scene was filmed on Leysdown Promenade showing the arrival by one of the leads on a bus. Leysdown on Sea is a coastal town on the Isle of Sheppey in Kent.

Filming locations also included West London Film Studios.

Episodes

References

External links

2018 British television series debuts
2018 British television series endings
2010s British drama television series
2010s British LGBT-related television series
2010s British mystery television series
2010s British teen television series
2010s teen drama television series
2010s British television miniseries
British teen drama television series
British thriller television series
Channel 4 television dramas
English-language Netflix original programming
Fiction about interracial romance
Massively multiplayer online role-playing games in fiction
Television shows about video games
Television series about teenagers
Television shows based on British novels
Television series by Kindle Entertainment
Television shows about virtual reality
British television series with live action and animation
Television shows set in Croatia
Television shows set in London